Verkhneaksyonovsky is a rural locality (a khutor) in Verkhnesolonovskoye Rural Settlement, Surovikinsky District, Volgograd Oblast, Russia. The population was 145 as of 2010. There are 4 streets.

Geography 
Verkhneaksyonovsky is located on the right bank of the Aksenets River, 82 km southwest of Surovikino (the district's administrative centre) by road. Posyolok otdeleniya 3 sovkhoza Krasnaya Zvezda is the nearest rural locality.

References 

Rural localities in Surovikinsky District